A lookbook is a collection of photographs compiled to show off a model, photographer, style, stylist, or clothing line. Usually, bloggers or vloggers will "model" fashionable looks for that month or season. This gives viewers ideas on how to style outfits, or to show what the latest fashions are. It is an especially popular term with "fashion bloggers".

Lookbooks in their online form can be described as "fashion diaries" because bloggers are constantly updating them on a daily or weekly basis. However, sometimes they are made to compile the looks of other people such as a celebrity, politician or socialite. They can also be used as an artist's portfolio.

Lookbook in fashion industry 
Lookbooks take a special place in the fashion industry, as they are used to present the product to the client. There are multiple reasons for that:

There is a global shift towards online business.
Online lookbook is a digital marketing tool that helps companies reach out to their target audience worldwide. For example, 'due to the increasing advancement in online marketing trends and rising trend of use of digital media for product marketing, the demand for online shopping of jewelry is predicted to witness tremendous growth in the coming years. Moreover, due to the growing adoption of technological advancement techniques and innovative stones for artificial jewelry is anticipated to contribute major growth in e-commerce industry. Due to the increasing trend is advanced standard of living, growing fashion, and living a luxury lifestyle the demand for global online jewelry market is anticipated to witness significant growth over the forecast period'. 

The lookbook helps to build an emotional connection with the clients.
To achieve it, all the professional lookbooks and catalogs makers advise presenting a product on a person and within a context."A golden diamond necklace on the white background says nothing. But if you put this necklace on the grandma’s neck and imagine a grandpa hugging her, you will see that this necklace is a symbol of life-long love. So, would you prefer to spend $1000 on a chain or the never-ending love?"

The fashion industry is fluid.
Trends and products are changing every 3 months. So, the companies are supposed to present a new collection every season. At the same time, lookbooks are comparatively easy to be created. To achieve this result companies automate a lookbook creation process. Nowadays, lookbooks may be connected to the product databases. In this case, the catalog can be updated every time there is a change of the product database. This is how fashion brands can stay up-to-date.

Design 
There are various tips to keep in mind while creating a lookbook:

 Create a simple background, not to distract people from a product's image.
 Generate high-quality and professional-looking images.
 Be consistent in terms of colors and fonts.
 Add a 'Buy' button so that the client can buy right from the online lookbook.
 Add the contact information.
 Include cover and back pages, short product descriptions, and social media share options

Following this gives you a chance to generate a lookbook that will sell.

Cinematography 

Whilst the lookbook term has become more prevalent in recent years through fashion vloggers, lookbooks have long been associated with cinematography.  Whereas a fashion lookbook has more in common with a portfolio, cinematography lookbooks will contain a collection of reference images illustrating scene layout, setting, and lighting.  This may be used by a cinematographer to show a director how to illustrate or communicate the intended result from a scene, or vice versa when the director has something particular in mind.

References

External links
The Look Book Blog—New York magazine
LOOKBOOK.TV Channel The LOOKBOOK Film Channel
Jacco Fashion Lookbook: Japanese and Korean Fashion

Fashion photography
Modeling (profession)